Felito Félix (born June 13, 1939) is a Puerto Rican singer, actor and song composer whose musical career has lasted for 69 years. He has recorded 67 albums. In addition, he is the composer of the municipal hymn of his hometown, Cidra, Puerto Rico.

Biography
Felito Félix is a native of Cidra, Puerto Rico. 

In 1976, Félix debuted as an actor, along with Spanish teen musical group La Pandilla in a movie named "La Pandilla en Apuros", an Alfred D. Herger production which was filmed in San Juan, Puerto Rico.

Félix had been semi-retired from his career as a musician after his wife was diagnosed with cancer; after her passing, he made a musical comeback.

Personal
Felito Félix was married for 50 years to Delia Rosa Garces, who died in a hospital after a long battle with cancer. Félix spent a long time by her side at the hospital before she died.

See also
 List of Puerto Ricans

References

1939 births
Living people
Puerto Rican male actors
20th-century Puerto Rican male singers
21st-century Puerto Rican male singers
Puerto Rican composers
People from Cidra, Puerto Rico